Events in the year 1261 in Norway.

Incumbents
Monarch: Magnus VI Haakonsson (along with Haakon IV Haakonsson)

Events
 11 September - Prince Magnus married Princess Ingeborg of Denmark in Bergen.
 The Norse community in Greenland agreed to submit to the Norwegian king.

Arts and literature

Births

Deaths
Knut Haakonsson, nobleman and claimant to the throne (born c. 1208).

References

Norway